Mining Journal may mean:

 The Mining Journal, the predominant daily newspaper of Marquette, Michigan, in the Upper Peninsula of Michigan.
 The Mining Journal (trade magazine), founded in 1835